In mathematics, Kuratowski's intersection theorem is a result in general topology that gives a sufficient condition for a nested sequence of sets to have a non-empty intersection.  Kuratowski's result is a generalisation of Cantor's intersection theorem.  Whereas Cantor's result requires that the sets involved be compact, Kuratowski's result allows them to be non-compact, but insists that their non-compactness "tends to zero" in an appropriate sense.  The theorem is named for the Polish mathematician Kazimierz Kuratowski, who proved it in 1930.

Statement of the theorem 

Let (X, d) be a complete metric space.  Given a subset A ⊆ X, its Kuratowski measure of non-compactness α(A) ≥ 0 is defined by

Note that, if A is itself compact, then α(A) = 0, since every cover of A by open balls of arbitrarily small diameter will have a finite subcover.  The converse is also true: if α(A) = 0, then A must be precompact, and indeed compact if A is closed.  Also, if A is a subset of B, then α(A) ≤ α(B).  In some sense, the quantity α(A) is a numerical description of "how non-compact" the set A is.

Now consider a sequence of sets An ⊆ X, one for each natural number n.  Kuratowski's intersection theorem asserts that if these sets are non-empty, closed, decreasingly nested (i.e. An+1 ⊆ An for each n), and α(An) → 0 as n → ∞, then their infinite intersection

is a non-empty compact set.

The result also holds if one works with the ball measure of non-compactness or the separation measure of non-compactness, since these three measures of non-compactness are mutually Lipschitz equivalent;  if any one of them tends to zero as n → ∞, then so must the other two.

References 

 

Compactness theorems